Early Learning Centre or Early Learning Center may refer to:
 Early Learning Centre, a British children's retailer
 Early Learning Center, a Russian children's retailer
 Early Learning Centre (building), of the University of Toronto